Papradište is a village in the municipality of Kičevo, North Macedonia. It used to be part of the former municipality of Oslomej.

Demographics
As of the 2021 census, Papradište had 8 residents with the following ethnic composition:
Albanians 8

According to the 2002 census, the village had a total of 75 inhabitants. Ethnic groups in the village include:
Albanians 74
Others 1

References

External links

Villages in Kičevo Municipality
Albanian communities in North Macedonia